The 1991 Giro del Trentino was the 15th edition of the Tour of the Alps cycle race and was held on 14 May to 17 May 1991. The race started in Riva del Garda and finished in Arco. The race was won by Leonardo Sierra.

General classification

References

1991
May 1991 sports events in Europe
1991 in road cycling
1991 in Italian sport